The 2013 Rhodes Lynx football team represented Rhodes College during the 2013 NCAA Division III football season. The team won the Southern Athletic Association. Dan Gritti was the team's head coach.

Schedule

References

Rhodes
Rhodes Lynx football seasons
Rhodes Lynx football